Nripendra Nath Roy(born  21 March 1959) is an Indian Politician belonging to the Forward Bloc. He was elected to the Lok Sabha, lower house of the Parliament of India from Cooch Behar constituency of West Bengal in 2009.

References

External links
 Official biographical sketch in Parliament of India website

Living people
1959 births
India MPs 2009–2014
All India Forward Bloc politicians
People from Cooch Behar district